Besson may refer to:

People
 Besson (surname)

Places
 Besson, Allier, a commune of the Allier département in France

Other uses
 Besson (music company), a manufacturer of brass instruments
 Besson (aircraft), a French aircraft manufacturer of the 1920s/1930s (particularly float planes)

See also

 Bessone (surname)
 Zec de la Bessonne, a controlled harvesting zone (zec) in Quebec, in Canada